The 2021 season is Selangor's 16th season in the Super League  and their 36th consecutive season in the top flight of Malaysia football. The club also participates in the Malaysia Cup and will also participate in the FA Cup.

Review

Selangor make a start of the season with recruit a new coach from Germany, Karsten Neitzel, after Technical Director Michael Feichtenbeiner only remains with the team as coach-interim in the end of last season after departure B. Sathianathan from the club. Selangor will begin the season on 6 March 2021.

For the pre-season and friendlies, the club can proceed, if COVID-19 pandemic decreases in their country or also to waits for the government's decision on whether the friendly match is allowed or not.

On 26 January 2021, the Malaysia Football League (MFL) has cancelled the 2021 FA Cup and deferred the start of the Malaysian League (M-League) to 5 March 2021 due to the enforcement of the Movement Control Order (MCO), including cause of increasing case due to COVID-19 Pandemic hit the country.

Pre-season and friendlies

The Derby

Mid Season

Squad information

First-team squad

Reserve Team Squad (call-up)

Transfers

First Transfers

21 November 2020 – 5 March 2021

Transfers in

Loan in

Transfer out 
 

Loan out

Competitions

Overall

Overview

Super League

Table

Results summary

Results by round

Fixtures and Results

Super League

Results overview

FA Cup

Due to COVID-19 pandemic in Malaysia, the tournament was cancelled immediately by Malaysia Football League (MFL).

Malaysia Cup

Selangor joined the competition in the group stage.

Group stage

Knock-out stage

Quarter-finals

Statistics

Squad statistics
 

Appearances (Apps.) numbers are for appearances in competitive games only including sub appearances.\
Red card numbers denote: Numbers in parentheses represent red cards overturned for wrongful dismissal.

† Player left the club during the season.

Goalscorers
Includes all competitive matches.

Top assists

Clean sheets

Disciplinary record

Notes

References

Selangor
Selangor FA